Val di Noto (English: Province of Noto) is a historical and geographical area encompassing the south-eastern third of Sicily; it is dominated by the limestone Hyblaean plateau. Historically, it was one of the three valli of Sicily.

History
The oldest recorded settlement in the Val di Noto was the ancient town of Akrai,  near Palazzolo Acreide, founded in 664 BC. It was the first colony of the Corinthian settlement at Syracuse.

The settlements of the Val di Noto were completely destroyed by the enormous 1693 Sicily earthquake. Following the earthquake, many towns were rebuilt on entirely new sites, such as Noto and Grammichele. The rulers of the time, the kings of Spain, granted the nobleman Giuseppe Lanza special authority to redesign the damaged towns, which he achieved by sympathetically designing the new towns in a baroque and renaissance style.

The new settlements were redesigned to have  a town square in the centre and to spread out in a radial pattern from there. Major buildings like churches, cloisters and palaces were built as focal points for the new streets, and the streets themselves were laid out in a grid pattern. Many of the individual towns were rebuilt to have a unique character, such as the town of Grammichele which was built in a hexagonal shape with the town square in the centre, consisting of the parish and town hall.
 
The towns were rebuilt in what came to be known as the Sicilian Baroque style; the most notable of which is the town of Noto itself, which is now a popular tourist destination due to its fine Baroque architecture.

Archaeology
The ruined town of Angie was rediscovered by the historian Tomas Fuentes in the 16th century.
Further excavations in the early 19th century by Baron Gabrielle Ally unearthed important artifacts from the early history of eastern Sicily.

Present day

In June 2002, UNESCO inscribed the towns of the Val di Noto on the World Heritage List as "representing the culmination and final flowering of Baroque art in Europe". The listed towns are Caltagirone, Militello in Val di Catania, Catania, Modica, Noto, Palazzolo Acreide, Ragusa, and Scicli.

Notes

World Heritage Sites in Italy
Sicilian Baroque
Geography of Sicily
Geographical, historical and cultural regions of Italy